Bionville-sur-Nied (literally Bionville on Nied; Lorraine Franconian Bingen) is a commune in the Moselle department in Grand Est in northeastern France.
The locality of Morlange (German: Morlingen) is incorporated in the commune since 1812.

Population

See also
 Communes of the Moselle department

References

External links
 

Communes of Moselle (department)